The Journal of Physical Organic Chemistry is a monthly peer-reviewed scientific journal, published since 1988 by John Wiley & Sons. It covers research in physical organic chemistry in its broadest sense and is available both online and in print. The current editor-in-chief is Rik Tykwinski (University of Alberta).

Highest cited papers 
The following papers have been cited over 180 times:
 Chiappe C, Pieraccini D. Ionic liquids: solvent properties and organic reactivity, 18(4): 275-297, 2005
 Carmichael AJ, Seddon KR. Polarity study of some 1-alkyl-3-methylimidazolium ambient-temperature ionic liquids with the solvatochromic dye, Nile Red, 13(10): 591-595, 2000
 Matyjaszewski K, Ziegler MJ, Arehart SV, et al. Gradient copolymers by atom transfer radical copolymerization, 13(12): 775-786, 2000

Abstracting and indexing 
The journal is indexed in Chemical Abstracts Service, Scopus, and Web of Science. According to the site, the impact factor as of 2020 is 2.391.

References

External links 
 

Physical chemistry journals
Wiley (publisher) academic journals
English-language journals
Publications established in 1988
Monthly journals